Laughing at Trouble is a 1936 American comedy film directed by Frank R. Strayer and written by Robert Ellis and Helen Logan. The film stars Jane Darwell, Brook Byron, Allan Lane, Sara Haden, Lois Wilson, and Margaret Hamilton. The film was released on December 11, 1936, by 20th Century Fox.

Plot

Cast 
Jane Darwell as Glory Bradford
Brook Byron as Mary Bradford 
Allan Lane as John Campbell
Sara Haden as Mrs. Jennie Nevins
Lois Wilson as Alice Mathews
Margaret Hamilton as Lizzie Beadle
Pert Kelton as Ella McShane
John Carradine as Deputy Sheriff Alec Brady
James Burke as Sheriff Bill Norton
Russell Hicks as Cyrus Hall
Eddie Acuff as Jamie Bradford
Frank Reicher as Dr. Larson
William "Billy" Benedict as Wilbur 
Edward McWade as Harvey

References

External links 
 

1936 films
American comedy films
1936 comedy films
20th Century Fox films
Films directed by Frank R. Strayer
American black-and-white films
1930s English-language films
1930s American films